Roy Kühne (born 27 September 1967) is a German physiotherapist and politician of the Christian Democratic Union (CDU) who served as a member of the Bundestag from the state of Lower Saxony from 2013 to 2021.

Political career 
Born in Magdeburg, Saxony-Anhalt, Kühne became a member of the Bundestag in the 2013 German federal election, representing the Goslar – Northeim – Osterode district. He was a member of the Health Committee, where he served as his parliamentary group’s rapporteur on healthcare professionals. In addition to his committee assignments, he co-chaired the German-Chinese Parliamentary Friendship Group.

Life after politics 
After leaving politics, Kühne became the head of government relations at Bauerfeind in 2022.

Political positions 
In June 2017, Kühne voted against his parliamentary group’s majority and in favor of Germany’s introduction of same-sex marriage.

References

External links 

 Bundestag biography 

1967 births
Living people
Members of the Bundestag for Lower Saxony
Members of the Bundestag 2017–2021
Members of the Bundestag 2013–2017
Members of the Bundestag for the Christian Democratic Union of Germany